Chou Huey-ying (born 20 January 1955) is a Taiwanese politician served on the Taiwan Provincial Consultative Council from 1989 to 1999, when she took a seat on the Legislative Yuan, representing Taipei County until 2002. She studied foreign languages at Tunghai University.

References

1955 births
Living people
21st-century Taiwanese women politicians
Tunghai University alumni
New Taipei Members of the Legislative Yuan
Members of the 4th Legislative Yuan
Members of the 5th Legislative Yuan
Democratic Progressive Party Members of the Legislative Yuan
20th-century Taiwanese women politicians